|}

The Dovecote Novices' Hurdle is a Grade 2 National Hunt hurdle race in Great Britain which is open to horses aged four years or older. It is run at Kempton Park over a distance of about 2 miles, and during its running there are eight hurdles to be jumped. The race is for novice hurdlers, and it is scheduled to take place each year in late February.

The race was first run in 1988 as a Listed event and was raised to Grade 2 in 1991.

The leading contenders sometimes go on to compete in the Supreme Novices' Hurdle in March. The most recent horse to achieve victory in both events was Flown in 1992.

Records
Leading jockey (3 wins):
 Robert Thornton – Senorita Rumbelita (2006), Trenchant (2009), Grumeti (2012)
 Barry Geraghty – Forgotten Voice (2013), Days of Heaven (2015), Winter Escape (2016)

Leading trainer (8 wins):
 Nicky Henderson – Over The Counter (1988), Flown (1992), Kimanicky (1996), Premier Generation (1999), Shatabdi (2007), Forgotten Voice (2013), Days of Heaven (2015), River Wylde (2017)

Winners since 1988

See also
 Horse racing in Great Britain
 List of British National Hunt races

References
 Racing Post:

 pedigreequery.com – Dovecote Novices' Hurdle – Kempton.

National Hunt races in Great Britain
Kempton Park Racecourse
National Hunt hurdle races
Recurring sporting events established in 1988
1988 establishments in England